This is a list of broadcasters airing WWE premier weekly television programs (Raw and SmackDown) and Premium Live Events.

United States Broadcasters

International broadcasting rights

Note

See also

List of professional wrestling television series
List of Impact Wrestling programming

References

Current programming